The 1987 European Athletics Junior Championships was the ninth edition of the biennial athletics competition for European athletes aged under twenty. It was held in Birmingham, United Kingdom between 6 and 9 August.

Men's results

Women's results

Medal table

References

Results
European Junior Championships 1987. World Junior Athletics History. Retrieved on 2013-05-27.

European Athletics U20 Championships
International athletics competitions hosted by England
European Junior
1987 in English sport
International sports competitions in Birmingham, West Midlands
1987 in youth sport